Hacıalanı  is a very small village in Erdemli district of Mersin Province, Turkey. Although the settled population of the village is only  19. as of 2011, the number of houses in the village exceeds 400. Because the village is actually a yayla (summer resort) and the population sharply increases during the summers up to 3000. The artificial lake Karakız is to the east of the village. The touristic potential of the village with the  Roman ruins as well as cedar forests is promising. But at the present tourism plays no important role in village economy. Main economic activity is farming. Main crops are tomato, cherry, peach, apple and beans. Animal breeding is another activity.

References

Villages in Erdemli District